The Laban sign is a Filipino hand gesture made by extending the thumb horizontally and the index finger pointing up, leaving the other fingers closed to create the letter L, which stands for laban (Filipino for "fight"). It is sometimes mistaken for the mildly offensive Western "loser" and "raised gun" gestures, to which it is unrelated. 

The term "LABAN" is an abbreviation of Lakas ng Bayan ("People's Power"), a former political coalition organised by opposition Senator Benigno S. Aquino Jr. for the 1978 Interim Batasang Pambansa regional elections. The gesture was popular in 1983 during Senator Aquino's funeral, and the 1986 People Power Revolution that his assassination had precipitated. The Laban sign branding was bestowed on Ninoy's widow, Cory Aquino, along with the color yellow by Public Relations practitioner Reli German.

In 2009, the Laban sign was again widely seen during the funeral of Cory Aquino, and the subsequent presidential campaign of their son, President Benigno Aquino III, before the 2010 Philippine elections. In 2021, upon announcing the presidential bid of Vice President Leni Robredo for the upcoming 2022 elections, the gesture was associated with her campaign.

References

Hand gestures
People Power Revolution